Lynn Williams may refer to:

Sports
Lynn Williams (sailor) (born 1939), American Olympic sailor
Lynn Williams (soccer) (born 1993), American soccer player

Other
Lynn R. Williams (1924–2014), Canadian labor leader and President of United Steelworkers of America
Lynn "Red" Williams (born 1963), American actor

See also
Lynn Kanuka-Williams (born 1960), Canadian Olympic runner